25 Martiou (literally 25th of March) is an under-construction metro station serving Thessaloniki Metro's Line 1 and Line 2. The station takes its name from a nearby major road, which commemorates the traditional date of the start of the Greek War of Independence in 1821. It is expected to enter service in 2023.

This station also appears in the 1988 Thessaloniki Metro proposal. In older iterations of the Thessaloniki Metro Lines Development Plan, the station is listed as Patrikiou,  named after Minas Patrikios (el), a lawyer who in 1925 became the first elected Mayor of Thessaloniki. In the 1988 proposal, Patrikiou and 25 Martiou are separate stations.

References

See also
List of Thessaloniki Metro stations

Thessaloniki Metro